Lee Yu-ri (Korean: 이유리; born January 28, 1981) is a South Korean actress. 
Lee first became known for her role in the teen drama series School 4, and subsequently gained popularity with her role in the family drama Precious Family (2005). In recent years, she became known for her role as the antagonist in television drama series Twinkle Twinkle (2011) and Jang Bo-ri is Here! (2014). She most recently starred in Spring Turns to Spring (2019) and Lie After Lie (2020).

In 2014, Lee won the Grand Prize at MBC Drama Awards, gaining 385,434 (about 54%) out of 712,300 votes sent in by the viewers. She was also ranked in the top five of Gallup Korea's "Actor of the Year", climbing to second place just behind Kim Soo-hyun.

Other activities
In 2011, Lee and fellow actress Kim Soo-kyum co-launched female apparel shopping mall 'Miss Today'.

Personal life
Lee Yu-ri met her husband, a missionary theologian, through bible study in 2008. They started dating in 2009 and married in September 2010.

Filmography

Film

Television series

Television shows

Music videos

Discography

Digital singles

Ambassador activities

Awards and nominations

Listicles

References

External links
 Official website 

1981 births
Living people
South Korean female idols
South Korean Christians
South Korean film actresses
South Korean television actresses